The Big Twelve Conference is a high school athletic conference in the Illinois High School Association (IHSA), based in Central Illinois. While the name implies that the conference has twelve schools, there are actually only eleven schools currently active, due to other schools either closing, ending offering varsity athletics, or changing conferences. 

The conference was indirectly responsible for the demise of the Capitol Conference in 1983 after voting to remove Springfield High School and add four schools from that conference.

All of the schools in the conference are located in cities on Interstate 74 which runs through central Illinois.

History
The conference origins date back to 1925 with charter schools that included; Bloomington, Champaign, Danville, Stephen Decatur, Lincoln, Jacksonville, Mattoon, Pekin, Peoria Central, Peoria Manual, Springfield, and Urbana. Bloomington left the conference for a period between 1927 and 1932 and Jacksonville left permanently in 1932. Streator joined the league in 1932 and remained until 1958, the same year Pekin, Peoria Central and Peoria Manual departed. In 1983, the conference morphed again with the departure of Springfield High School and the addition of Champaign Centennial, Decatur Eisenhower, Decatur MacArthur, Normal Community, and Rantoul, bringing the total number of teams back to 12.

The league transitioned into a two-division, East-West format with Centennial, Central, Danville, Mattoon, Rantoul and Urbana in the East and Bloomington, Decatur, Eisenhower, MacArthur, Lincoln, and Normal in the West. Lincoln left the conference in 1994, however, Normal Community West entered the league in 1995.  Stephen Decatur closed in 1999, bringing membership down to eleven. Rantoul departed in 2004, Mattoon left in 2012 and both Decatur schools, Eisenhower and MacArthur followed suit in 2013. Mattoon joined the Apollo Conference in order to play schools of similar size and Eisenhower and MacArthur joined the Central State Eight Conference Both schools were the final two schools from Decatur that remained in the conference, and the member schools of the CS8 are mostly from the Springfield area.

Starting with the 2014-2015 school year, four Peoria schools joined the Big Twelve, with the departure of the two Decatur schools. The four schools who joined are Manual High School, Peoria High School, Peoria Notre Dame High School, and Richwoods High School.

Member schools

Membership timeline 
Beginning in 1925, the Big Twelve Conference competes in 11 boys, 13 girls and 13 coed sports and activities within the IHSA.

References

External links
Illinois High School Association (IHSA) official website

Illinois high school sports conferences
Education in Champaign County, Illinois
Education in Coles County, Illinois
Education in Macon County, Illinois
Education in McLean County, Illinois
Education in Vermilion County, Illinois